is an impersonation variety owarai special program broadcast on Nippon Television on May 3, 2009. It is a renewal of Monomane Battle, which ended its broadcast on January 4 earlier that year. Neptune serves as the presenters of the event with Hélène Hayama and Mika Oguma providing additional assistance, replacing the previous Naoko Ken and Hiromi.

Rules

The Tournament
 The event is held in a tournament fashion, with groups of competitors divided into blocks beforehand.
 The contestants must prepare material for a match, the semifinal and the final.
 The 24 competitors are split into three sets of eight blocks. The semi-finals are made up of the winners of each block. The final consists of four contestants.
 The winner is awarded a prize of 1 million Yen (equivalent to approximately 10,000 dollars).

The Survival
 Personal one-on-one matches are decided through lottery cards.

Presenters

Chairpeople
 Neptune
 Jun Nagura
 Ken Horiuchi
 Taizō Harada

Progress
 Hélène Hayama
 Mika Oguma (The Survival)

Contestants

The Tournament
Hiroiki Ariyoshi, Ungirls, Ijiri Okada, Satoshi Onoma and Twotone Aoki, Kannazuki, Kōji Tomita, Croket, The Newspaper, Shinobu-chan, Tamiaki and Ryu, Chōshin Juku, Nakagawake, Yuki Nishio, Nobu and Fukkey, Hanawa, Akimasa Haraguchi, Vitamin S, Takashi Kanemitsu (of Plus Minus), Makita Sports, Monster Engine, Hōsei Yamasaki, Kōichi Yamadera

The Survival
Hiroiki Ariyoshi, Ungirls, Ijiri Okada, Kannazuki, Kuwabata Ohara, Kōji Tomita, Yoshio Kojima, Croket Sakurazuka Yakkun, The Touch, Zabunguru, Shinobu-chan and Megumi Fukushita and Maki Aizawa, Tamiaki and Yoppi, Chōshin Juku, Take2, Tony Hirota and Chihiro Sakurai and Kōenji Pulsar, Doburokki, Nakagawake, Yuki Nishio, Yūki Ninomiya, Nobu and Fukkey, Hanawa, Akimasa Haraguchi, Harō Ueda, Vitamin S, Takashi Kanemitsu (of Plus Minus), Hori, Ken Maeda, Mitchy, Hōsei Yamasaki, Kōichi Yamadera, Ryu and Twotone Aoki and Hazuki Pal

Judges

The Tournament
Akira Nakao, Kunikazu Katsumata, Peeko, Miyuki Itori

The Survival
Tsutomu Sekine, Suzanne, Tsunku, Aya Sugimoto, Ayana Tsubaki

Broadcast dates

Results

First match
A Block

B Block

C Block

D Block

E Block

F Block

G Block

H Block

Semi-finals
A Block

B Block

C Block

D Block

Finals

Related programs
 Tamori no Sekai Sokkuri Taishō
 Shijō Saiko Sokkuri Taishō
 Bakushō Sokkuri Monomane Kōhaku Utagassen Special (Fuji Television)
 The Monomane (TBS TV)

External links
 Official site

Nippon TV original programming
Japanese television specials
2009 television specials
2009 in Japanese television